The following people played for the Chicago Bulls for at least one game in the 1926 AFL regular season, the only one of the team's (and the league's) existence:

1 Started season with Chicago Bears
2 Also played end
3 Also played guard
4 Finished season with Racine Tornadoes
5 Finished season with Louisville Colonels
6 Played for both Frankford Yellow Jackets and Providence Steam Roller before joining Bulls
7 Also played tailback
8 Started season with Frankford Yellow Jackets
9 Started season with Rock Island Independents
10 Played both wingback and fullback
11 Played wingback, tailback, and fullback

References

 
Chicago Bulls (AFL) players